Kanthirava Narasaraja II was the fifteenth maharaja of the Kingdom of Mysore from 1704 to 1714. He was born deaf and came to be called Múk-arasu (literally "mute king").  He succeeded to the throne through the influence of the prime minister, Tirumala Iyengar.  During his reign, his dalvoy (chief of the army), who was also named Kanthirava, led an expedition to subdue Chikkaballapur, but was killed during the fighting.  His son later took over and succeeded in establishing Mysore's suzerainty.

Notes

References 

1673 births
1714 deaths
Indian male poets
Kings of Mysore
Wadiyar dynasty
Deaf royalty and nobility
18th-century Indian monarchs
17th-century Indian poets
18th-century Indian poets
Poets from Karnataka
Indian deaf people